The 1951–52 season was Molde's 4th consecutive year in the second tier of Norwegian football, their first in Landsdelsserien, which began this season.

This season, Molde competed in the inaugural season of Landsdelsserien and the 1952 Norwegian Cup.

Season events

Squad
Source:

Friendlies

Competitions

Landsdelsserien (Møre)

Results

Table

1952 Norwegian Cup

Molde qualified for the 1952 Norwegian Cup by defeating Veblungsnes in the qualifying round. By defeating Hødd in the second round, Molde reached the third round of the Norwegian Cup for the first time in club history.

Season statistics

Appearances
Source:

See also
Molde FK seasons

References

1951 52